Penny Allen can refer to:

Penelope Allen, American actress
Penny Allen, British journalist and writer